Quicksand is a  1950 American film noir that stars Mickey Rooney and Peter Lorre and portrays a garage mechanic's descent into crime. It was directed by Irving Pichel shortly before he was included in the Hollywood blacklist (which was instituted by the House Un-American Activities Committee to block screenwriters with suspected Communist affiliation from obtaining employment). The film provided Rooney with an opportunity to play against type, performing in a role starkly different from his earlier role as the innocent "nice guy" in MGM's popular Andy Hardy film series.

Plot

Dan Brady (Mickey Rooney), a young auto mechanic in California, "borrows" $20 ($ today) from the cash register at his job to pay for a date with blonde femme fatale Vera Novak (Jeanne Cagney), who works at a nearby diner.

In a scheme to return the pilfered $20, Dan decides to pay only one dollar as a down payment at a jewelry store for a $100 wristwatch ($ today), a deal that requires him to sign a sales contract to buy the watch over time with regular installment payments. He then promptly goes to a pawnshop where he hocks the watch for $30 cash ($ today), using most of that money to cover the missing funds at the garage. However, the next day Brady is tracked down by an investigator who informs him that he has violated the installment contract by pawning a watch he does not legally own. The investigator tells him that if he does not pay the jewelry store the full $100 for the watch within 24 hours, he will be charged with grand larceny, a crime punishable by three years in state prison. After unsuccessfully applying for a payday loan and attempting to use his car as collateral for another loan, a desperate Dan resorts to mugging a tipsy bar patron known for carrying large amounts of cash.

Nick Dramoshag (Peter Lorre), the seedy owner of a penny arcade on Santa Monica Pier and a man who has had his own intimate history with Vera, discovers evidence of Dan's mugging. He blackmails the young mechanic, demanding a car from Dan's job in exchange for his silence. Dan steals the car, which he trades for the evidence from Dramoshag. Dan's morally lacking boss Oren Mackey (Art Smith) soon confronts Dan and says he knows that he stole the car. Mackey demands the return of the vehicle or $3,000 in cash ($ today), or he will go to the police.

Dan and Vera steal the month-end receipts from Dramoshag's arcade, obtaining $3,610 ($ today). Dan expects to use the money to pay Mackey. Vera, however, feels entitled to half the money, so she buys herself a mink coat for $1,800 ($ today). Once he learns what she has done, a furious Dan returns to the garage alone, where he offers Mackey $1,800 to settle their arrangement. Mackey takes the money, but picks up the phone to call the police. After Mackey pulls a gun, the two men struggle and Dan strangles his boss with the phone cord. Certain that the man is dead, Brady takes Dan's gun and returns to Vera to inform her of what he has done. He asks her to flee with him to Texas. She will not go, insisting that the authorities have no evidence against her. Disgusted by Vera's self-serving behavior, Dan storms out.

Outside Vera's apartment, Dan's still-loyal but unappreciated former girlfriend Helen (Barbara Bates) waits in his car to talk with him. She had seen him earlier on the street and realized then that he was in trouble. She now decides to accompany Dan as they drive out of town to avoid his anticipated arrest for murder. After his car breaks down, Brady carjacks a sedan, which happens to be driven by a sympathetic lawyer (Taylor Holmes). Dan subsequently gets out of that car when they arrive at Santa Monica Pier. There, he tells Helen to remain with the lawyer as he carries out his new plan to escape to Mexico on a friend's charter boat. He also assures Helen that he will send for her once he is safely resettled across the border. A few minutes later, the lawyer and Helen hear over the sedan's radio a news report that Mackey survived his injuries. They now drive back to the pier to find Dan and inform him that he is not a murderer. Meanwhile, police officers spot Dan there, wound him by gunfire in an ensuing chase, and take him into custody. Helen comforts Dan and vows to wait for him until he is released from prison.

Cast

 Mickey Rooney as Dan
 Jeanne Cagney as Vera
 Barbara Bates as Helen
 Peter Lorre as Nick
 Taylor Holmes as Harvey
 Art Smith as Mackey
 Red Nichols as himself
 Wally Cassell as Chuck
 Richard Lane as Lt. Nelson
 Patsy O'Connor as Millie
 John Gallaudet as Moriarity
 Minerva Urecal as Landlady
 Sidney Marion as Shorty
 Jimmie Dodd as Buzz (as Jimmy Dodd)
 Lester Dorr as Baldy
 Kitty O'Neil as Madame Zaronga
 Jack Elam (uncredited speaking role as bar patron)

Production
Rooney co-financed Quicksand with Peter Lorre, but their shares of the profits were reportedly left unpaid by a third partner. Most of the film was shot on location in Santa Monica, California, with exterior scenes at the old Santa Monica Pier. Jazz cornetist Red Nichols with His Five Pennies group are seen and heard in a nightclub scene.

Peter Lorre's fellow actors in Quicksand were impressed with his performances on the set. Commenting on the film in a later interview, Jeanne Cagney observed the following about Lorre: "He did it with all his might. Even though the picture was not a top drawer film he still approached it as if it were the 'A' picture of all 'A' pictures."

The composer of the musical score for Quicksand, Russian-born Louis Gruenberg, was a great lover of American jazz and a close friend of the renowned Austrian composer Arnold Schoenberg. When hired to work on the film, both Gruenberg and director Irving Pichel were already under congressional investigation by the House Un-American Activities Committee (HUAC) as its searched to identify and expose Communists and any of their sympathizers in the movie industry, labor unions, journalism, and in many other areas of American society. Rooney and Lorre, by financing the production of Quicksand themselves, had the power to give their beleaguered colleagues much-needed opportunities to be employed and to share their creative talents. Despite Rooney and Lorre's efforts to help the composer and director, Gruenberg and Pichel soon vanished from Hollywood.

Reception
Newspaper and trade publication reviews of the film in 1950 were mixed, with many being either mildly complimentary or negative. The Los Angeles Times is one of the major newspapers that year that gives the film a generally positive review. While the newspaper deems the film's plot as "predictable", it still assures moviegoers that it is "one that grips you every minute". The Los Angeles Times also draws particular attention to the performances of supporting cast and to subtleties in Rooney's portrayal of Dan Brady:
Herm Shoenfeld of Variety, the entertainment industry's most widely read trade paper in 1950, characterizes Quicksand as "an okay meller with a crime-does-not-pay moral" and with a screenplay that is "fast, straightforward". He does, though, criticize the plot as having "several implausible stretches" but adds that the film's "overall speed sustains interest throughout." Shoenfeld also rates Rooney's performance as merely adequate. "As a dramatic actor", he writes, "Rooney is competent but fails to show wide range." Mae Tinée, a reviewer for the Chicago Daily Tribune also had a mixed reaction to the crime drama. Headlining her assessment "Rooney Is Cast as a Criminal in 'Quicksand'", she describes the film as "unpretentious" and expresses a decided preference for the storyline's first half when compared to its "contrived" latter half:

The New York Times in its review is far less kind to the film, calling it an "uninspired melodrama" that "hammers home several unoriginal ideas in a fairly stodgy fashion." "Mr. Rooney", asserts the Times, "sums it all up when he plaintively remarks, 'Boy, am I in a mess.'" The New York Herald Tribune, agreeing with its cross-town news competitor, refers to the film as a "dreary screen saga" and judges Rooney "equally dreary in the acting department." The newspaper then describes Rooney’s character Dan as a "thoroughly unsavory character, poorly delineated by script-writer Robert Smith".

Modern reception
Decades after its release, Quicksand continues to draw the attention of film historians and movie fans, especially among those with a special interest in film noir. In his 2013 review, Bruce Eder for AllMovie notes that Rooney "gives what many consider to be the best performance of his career", and he considers the film to be "one of the more fascinating social documents of its era." Richard Mellor, in an earlier review for the UK-based review site Eye For Film, focused in part on the film's inherent attraction to audiences, to the appeal of being witnesses to the downward spiral of "everyman Dan Brady". It is a descent in Mellor's view that "is an enjoyable, if cloyingly predictable, fall from grace." He therefore questions in his 2009 review the validity of attaching broader issues or more complex interpretations to the film decades after its initial screening. In his opinion the film's message is quite simple and imparts a timeless, universal lesson. "It's doubtful", he contends, "whether 'Quicksand' reflects the social uncertainty of the period, as some have claimed, but it certain[ly] proves the danger that slick operators offer to a gullible dufus like Dan."

References

External links

 
 
 
 
 Quicksand informational site and DVD review at DVD Beaver (includes images)
 

1950 films
1950 crime films
American black-and-white films
American crime films
1950s English-language films
Film noir
Films directed by Irving Pichel
Films set in Santa Monica, California
Films shot in Los Angeles County, California
United Artists films
1950s American films
English-language crime films